Essenheim is an Ortsgemeinde – a municipality belonging to a Verbandsgemeinde, a kind of collective municipality – in the Mainz-Bingen district in Rhineland-Palatinate, Germany.

Geography

Location
Essenheim lies in Rhenish Hesse southwest of Mainz. The winegrowing centre belongs to the Verbandsgemeinde of Nieder-Olm, whose seat is in the like-named town.

Politics

Municipal council 

Elections in 2014:
SPD: 11
CDU:  2
FWG:  5
GAL:  2

Coat of arms
The municipality's arms might be described thus: Per pale sable and Or two lions combattant, the dexter of the second armed, langued and crowned gules, the sinister with double tail of the third armed and langued azure.

Culture and sightseeing

Regular events
The Essenheim kermis (church consecration festival, locally known as the Kerb) was once held in late August, but since 2007, it has been held on the second weekend in September.

Essenheim also celebrates a canons’ festival (Domherrnfest). Besides selected wines, the street and courtyard festival offers a great many culinary highlights with background music by various artists.

Economy and infrastructure
Essenheim is characterized by winegrowing and fruitgrowing.

Transport
The municipality lies right near the Autobahn A 63 with its Nieder-Olm interchange (4).
A Deutsche Bahn railway station is to be found in the neighbouring town of Nieder-Olm.
Two city bus routes run right through Essenheim, routes 71 and 650, both towards either Stadecken or the main railway station in Mainz.

References

Further reading
  44 pages from the records of Johann Probst.

External links

Municipality’s official webpage 
Essenheim in the collective municipality’s Web pages 
Essenheim’s history 

Municipalities in Rhineland-Palatinate
Rhenish Hesse
Mainz-Bingen